The BT x86 assembly language instruction stands for Bit Test and was added to the x86 instruction set with the 80386 processor. BT copies a bit from a given register to the carry flag.

Example: copy the third least significant bit from EAX to the carry flag
BT EAX, 2

BTS (Bit Test and Set) operates the same, but also sets the bit in the register, while BTR (Bit Test and Reset) resets it, and BTC (Bit Test and Complement) flips it.

Logical Explanation BT

   BT SRC, POSITION

   SRC
      Represent as bits array

   POSITION
      Represent as numeric position
      From Right to Left
      Start at 0

   CF
      Carry Flag

   Result
      CF = SRC[POSITION]

Logical Explanation BTC

   BTC SRC, POSITION

   SRC
      Represent as bits array for CF Result
      Represent as hex for SRC Result

   POSITION
      Represent as numeric position
      From Right to Left
      Start at 0

   CF
      Carry Flag

   Result
      CF = SRC[POSITION]
      XOR SRC, POW(2,POSITION)

References 

X86 instructions